Malaipet (born as Mongkhon Wiwasuk on December 21, 1981) is a Thai professional Muay Thai fighter, kickboxer and former mixed martial artist. He is a former Rajadamnern Stadium Champion who currently resides in Fresno, California. In MMA, Malaipet has fought for EliteXC, King of the Cage and in kickboxing he has competed for K-1, SLAMM!! Events, Bellator Kickboxing and Thai & Kickbox SuperLeague.

Biography and career
Malaipet started practicing Muay Thai at the age of 8. He is known for his devastating kicks and clinch and fought for EliteXC most of his MMA career. Malaipet is currently on hiatus from MMA to focus on Muay Thai. The biopic film based on his life, Legendary was released in late 2009. Malaipet is also featured in the 2011 video game Supremacy MMA. He is the older cousin of Rungravee Sasiprapa and Buakaw Banchamek.

He stopped Vishnu Gulati in the second round of their contest at Lion Fight 8 in Las Vegas on January 25, 2013.

He defeated Sean Kearney via unanimous decision at Push Kick: World Stand Off in Pomona, California, USA on March 2, 2013.

Malaipet was set to fight Hakeem Dawodu at Lion Fight 10 in Las Vegas on July 26, 2013 but Dawodu pulled out of the bout just two days before for undisclosed reasons and was replaced by Sean Kearney. Malaipet scored a knockdown with an elbow from the clinch in round two and won by majority decision.

Malaipet stopped Caio Uruguai in round one with a counter overhand right at Lion Fight 11 in Las Vegas on September 20, 2013.

He lost to Fabio Pinca by unanimous decision in a fight for the inaugural Lion Fight Welterweight Championship at Lion Fight 12 in Las Vegas on November 1, 2013.

Malaipet lost to Shane Oblonsky via UD at Lion Fight 14 in Las Vegas on March 28, 2014.

He defeated Justin Greskiewicz at Lion Fight 17 in Ledyard, Connecticut on August 1, 2014 by unanimous decision.

Titles
 Rajadamnern Stadium
 Rajadamnern Stadium Champion

 WBC Muaythai
 WBC Muaythai International Super Welterweight Champion (one time)
 WBC Muaythai United States Welterweight (-66.6 kg/147 lb) Championship (one time, current)
 International Kickboxing Association 
 IKBA World Champion

 International Karate Kickboxing Council 
 IKKC USA Champion
 IKKC World Welterweight Champion

 International Muay Thai Organization 
 IMTO USA Champion
 IMTO World Welterweight Champion

Kickboxing record

|-  bgcolor="#CCFFCC"
| 2017-09-23 || Win ||align=left| Jose Palacios || Bellator Kickboxing 7 || San Jose, USA || Decision (unanimous) || 3 || 3:00 || 9-7
|-
|-
|-  bgcolor="#FFBBBBB"
| 2016-10-21 || Loss||align=left| Jo Nattawut ||Lion Fight 32|| Las Vegas, Nevada, USA || Decision (unanimous) || 5 || 3:00  ||
|-
! style=background:white colspan=9 |
|-
|-  bgcolor="#FFBBBBB"
| 2015-07-31 || Loss||align=left| Liam Harrison ||Lion Fight 23 || California, United States || Decision (split)|| 5 || 3:00  ||
|-
|-  bgcolor="#CCFFCC"
| 2015-03-27|| Win ||align=left| Ben Yelle|| Lion Fight 21 || Temecula, California, USA || Decision (unanimous) || 5 || 3:00 || 
|-
|-  bgcolor="#CCFFCC"
| 2014-08-01 || Win ||align=left| Justin Greskiewicz|| Lion Fight 17 || Ledyard, Connecticut, USA || TKO (corner stop/towel) || 5 || 3:00 || 
|-
|-  bgcolor="#FFBBBBB"
| 2014-03-28 || Loss ||align=left| Shane Oblonsky || Lion Fight 14 || Las Vegas, Nevada, USA || Decision (unanimous) || 5 || 3:00 || 
|-
|-  bgcolor="#FFBBBBB"
| 2013-11-01 || Loss ||align=left| Fabio Pinca || Lion Fight 12 || Las Vegas, Nevada, USA || Decision (unanimous) || 5 || 3:00 ||
|-
! style=background:white colspan=9 |
|-
|-  bgcolor="#CCFFCC"
| 2013-09-20 || Win ||align=left| Caio Uruguai || Lion Fight 11 || Las Vegas, Nevada || TKO (overhand right) || 1 || 1:52 || 5-1 
|-  bgcolor="#CCFFCC"
| 2013-07-26 || Win ||align=left| Sean Kearney|| Lion Fight 10 || Las Vegas, Nevada || Decision (majority) || 5 || 3:00 || 
|-  bgcolor="#CCFFCC"
| 2013-03-02 || Win ||align=left| Sean Kearney || Muay Thai World Stand Off || Pomona, California || Decision (unanimous) || 5 || 3:00 || 
|-  bgcolor="#CCFFCC"
| 2013-01-25 || Win ||align=left| Vishnu Gulati || Lion Fight 8 || Las Vegas, Nevada || TKO (low kicks) || 2 || 1:57 || 
|-  bgcolor="#CCFFCC"
| 2012-05-12 || Win ||align=left| Justin Greskiewicz || Lion Fight 6 || Las Vegas, Nevada || Decision (unanimous) || 5 || 3:00 || 
|-
|-  bgcolor="#CCFFCC"
| 2011-11-19 || Win ||align=left| Jose Palacios || Lion Fight 4 || Las Vegas, Nevada, USA || Decision (split) || 5 || 3:00 || 8-2
|-
! style=background:white colspan=9 |
|-
|-  style="background:#c5d2ea;"
| 2011-07-30 || Draw ||align=left| Tim Thomas || Elite Kickboxing || Las Vegas, Nevada || Draw || 5 || 3:00 ||
|-  bgcolor="#FFBBBBB"
| 2011-02-12 || Loss ||align=left| Michael Mananquil || Battle in the Desert, Buffalo Bills Casino || Las Vegas, Nevada || Decision (unanimous) || 5 || 3:00 ||
|-
! style=background:white colspan=9 |
|-
|-  bgcolor="#FFBBBB"
| 2010-12-05 || Loss ||align=left| Kevin Ross || King's Birthday Celebration, Commerce Casino || Los Angeles, California || Decision (unanimous) || 5 || 3:00 ||
|-  bgcolor="#FFBBBB"
| 2010-10-09 || Loss ||align=left| Xu Yan || Legends of Heroes: Muaythai vs Kung Fu, Arena of Stars, Genting Highlands || Pahang, Malaysia || Decision || 3 || 3:00 ||
|-  bgcolor="#CCFFCC"
| 2010-07-18 || Win ||align=left| Michael Mananquil || Tuff Promotions presents: WMC Full Rules Muay Thai || Montebello, California || Decision (split) || 5 || 3:00 ||
|-  bgcolor="#FFBBBB"
| 2010-04-03 || Loss ||align=left| Christophe Pruvost || Muay Thai in America || Santa Monica, California || Decision (split) || 5 || 3:00 ||
|-
! style=background:white colspan=9 |
|-
|-  bgcolor="#CCFFCC"
| 2009-12-05 || Win ||align=left| James Cook || WCK World Championship Muay Thai, Buffalo Bills Casino || Primm, Nevada || TKO (corner stoppage) || 4 || 3:00 ||
|-
! style=background:white colspan=9 |
|-
|-  bgcolor="#CCFFCC"
| 2009-07-25 || Win ||align=left| Richard Fenwick || WCK World Championship Muay Thai, Las Vegas Hilton || Las Vegas, Nevada || Decision (unanimous) || 5 || 3:00 ||
|-
! style=background:white colspan=9 |
|-
|-  bgcolor="#CCFFCC"
| 2009-06-13 || Win ||align=left| Jason Scerri || WCK: Full Rules Muaythai || Inglewood, California || TKO (doc stop/cut) || 3 || 2:18 ||
|-  bgcolor="#FFBBBB"
| 2009-01-29 || Loss ||align=left| Richard Fenwick || WCK Full Rules Muay Thai || Highland, California || Decision (split) || 5 || 3:00 ||
|-
! style=background:white colspan=9 |
|-
|-  bgcolor="#FFBBBB"
| 2008-06-20 || Loss ||align=left| Yodsaenklai Fairtex || WCK: World Championship Muay Thai "Champions of Champions" || Montego Bay, Jamaica || TKO (doc stop/cut, swollen left eye) || 3 || 3:00 ||
|-
! style=background:white colspan=9 |
|-
|-  bgcolor="#CCFFCC"
| 2008-03-03 || Win ||align=left| Denis Scheidmiller || SLAMM "Nederland vs Thailand IV" || Almere, Netherlands || Decision (unanimous) || 5 || 3:00 ||
|-  bgcolor="#CCFFCC"
| 2008-01-12 || Win ||align=left| Xu Yan || WCK: Full Rules Muaythai || Gardena, California || TKO (elbow injury) || 1 || 2:43 ||
|-  bgcolor="#CCFFCC"
| 2007-09-08 || Win ||align=left| Jan van Denderen || WBC Muay Thai Presents: World Championship Muay Thai || Gardena, California || Decision (unanimous) || 5 || 3:00 ||
|-  bgcolor="#CCFFCC"
| 2007-01-11 || Win ||align=left| Masaaki Kazuya || WCK World Championship Muay Thai, San Manuel Casino || Upland, California || TKO (kicks to the body) || 3 || 1:07 ||
|-  bgcolor="#CCFFCC"
| 2006-12-17 || Win ||align=left| Fernando Calleros || Xtream Muay Thai Challenge II || Inglewood, California || TKO (corner stop/cut) || 2 || 3:00 ||
|-  bgcolor="#CCFFCC"
| 2006-09-30 || Win ||align=left| Le Feng Chen || World Championship Muay Thai: "Ultimate Conquest" || Inglewood, California || TKO (corner stop/towel) || 2 || 2:54 ||
|-
! style=background:white colspan=9 |
|-
|-  bgcolor="#CCFFCC"
| 2006-07-08 || Win ||align=left| Youssef Akhnikh || WCK World Championship Muay Thai: Hot Summer Fights || Inglewood, California || Decision (unanimous) || 5 || 3:00 ||
|-
! style=background:white colspan=9 |
|-
|-  bgcolor="#CCFFCC"
| 2006-04-01 || Win ||align=left| Benito Caupain || WCK World Championship Muay Thai || Upland, California || Decision (unanimous) || 5 || 3:00 ||
|-
! style=background:white colspan=9 |
|-
|-  bgcolor="#CCFFCC"
| 2005-12-17 || Win ||align=left| Fikri Tijarti || WCK World Championship Muay Thai || Inglewood, California || Decision (unanimous) || 5 || 3:00 ||
|-
! style=background:white colspan=9 |
|-
|-  bgcolor="#CCFFCC"
| 2005-08-20 || Win ||align=left| Danny Steele || WCK World Championship Muay Thai: Hot Summer Fights || Inglewood, California || Decision (unanimous) || 5 || 3:00 ||
|-
! style=background:white colspan=9 |
|-
|-  bgcolor="#CCFFCC"
| 2005-05-28 || Win ||align=left| Marco Pique || WCK World Championship Muay Thai || Las Vegas, Nevada || Decision (unanimous) || 5 || 3:00 ||
|-
! style=background:white colspan=9 |
|-
|-  bgcolor="#CCFFCC"
| 2005-02-05 || Win ||align=left| Tarik Benefkih || WCK World Championship Muay Thai || Las Vegas, Nevada || Decision (split) || 5 || 3:00 ||
|-
! style=background:white colspan=9 |
|-
|-  bgcolor="#c5d2ea"
| 2004-12-18 || Draw ||align=left| Chris van Venrooij || SuperLeague Netherlands 2004 || Uden, Netherlands || Decision draw (injury) || 1 || N/A ||
|-  bgcolor="#CCFFCC"
| 2004-10-23 || Win ||align=left| Timo Bonfiglio || SuperLeague Germany 2004 || Oberhausen, Germany || KO (head kick) || 5 || 1:00 ||
|-  bgcolor="#FFBBBB"
| 2004-05-22 || Loss ||align=left| Peter Crooke || SuperLeague Switzerland 2004 || Winterthur, Switzerland || Decision (unanimous) || 5 || 3:00 ||
|-  bgcolor="#FFBBBB"
| 2004-01-10 || Loss ||align=left| Duane Ludwig || Ring of Fire 11: Bring it On, Douglas County Event Center || Castle Rock, CO || Decision (unanimous) || 5 || 3:00 ||
|-
! style=background:white colspan=9 |
|-
|-  bgcolor="#FFBBBB"
| 2003-12-06 || Loss ||align=left| Chris van Venrooij || SuperLeague Netherlands 2003 || Rotterdam, Netherlands || Decision (unanimous) || 5 || 3:00 ||
|-  bgcolor="#CCFFCC"
| 2003-09-27 || Win ||align=left| Patrick Erickson || SuperLeague Germany 2003 || Wuppertal, Germany || Decision (unanimous) || 5 || 3:00 ||
|-  bgcolor="#CCFFCC"
| 2003-08-24 || Win ||align=left| James Cook || Main Event Fights 5 || Fresno, California || Decision (unanimous) || 5 || 3:00 ||
|-  bgcolor="#CCFFCC"
| 2003-04-27 || Win ||align=left| Eric Castaños || Ultimate Muay Thai Challenge, Table Mountain Casino || Fresno, California || KO (overhand right) || 2 || 0:47 || 40-3
|-
! style=background:white colspan=9 |
|-
|-  bgcolor="#CCFFCC"
| 2002-11-15 || Win ||align=left| Craig Buchanan || WCK World Championship Muay Thai || Victorville, California || Decision (unanimous) || 5 || 3:00 ||
|-
! style=background:white colspan=9 |
|-
|-  bgcolor="#CCFFCC"
| 2002-06-21 || Win ||align=left| Jose Osorio || Angel Marroquin Promotions || Mexico City, Mexico || KO (right hooks) || 2 || N/A ||
|-
|-  bgcolor="#CCFFCC"
| 2002-02-12 || Win ||align=left| Michael Parker || Thai Boxe Showcase || Los Angeles, California || TKO (push kick to the body) || 1 || 1:12 ||
|-
|-  bgcolor="#CCFFCC"
| 2001-09-07 || Win ||align=left| Phutawan Buriramphukaofire || Lumpinee Stadium || Bangkok, Thailand || TKO (arm injury) || 1 || 3:00 ||
|-
|-  bgcolor="#FFBBBB"
| 1999-00-00 || Loss ||align=left| Sangtanong ||  || Bangkok, Thailand || Decision (unanimous) || 5 || 3:00 ||
|-  bgcolor="#CCFFCC"
|-
| colspan=9 | Legend:

Mixed martial arts record

|-
| Loss
| align=center| 3–4
| Musa Toliver
| Decision (unanimous)
| KOTC: Arrival
| 
| align=center| 3
| align=center| 5:00
| Highland, California, United States
| 
|-
| Loss
| align=center| 3–3
| David Douglas
| TKO (punches)
| ShoXC: Elite Challenger Series
| 
| align=center| 3
| align=center| 2:51
| Santa Ynez, California, United States
| 
|-
| Loss
| align=center| 3–2
| Thomas Denny
| DQ (illegal elbows)
| ShoXC: Elite Challenger Series
| 
| align=center| 1
| align=center| 4:51
| Santa Ynez, California, United States
| 
|-
| Win
| align=center| 3–1
| Kaleo Kwan
| Decision (unanimous)
| ShoXC: Elite Challenger Series
| 
| align=center| 3
| align=center| 5:00
| Santa Ynez, California, United States
| 
|-
| Win
| align=center| 2–1
| Rinat Mirzabekov
| Decision (unanimous)
| Independent Event
| 
| align=center| 3
| align=center| 5:00
| Highland, California, United States
| 
|-
| Loss
| align=center| 1–1
| Anthony McDavitt
| Decision (unanimous)
| California Cage Championships
| 
| align=center| 3
| align=center| 5:00
| Santa Monica, California, United States
| 
|-
| Win
| align=center| 1–0
| Zhao Zhao
| KO (punches)
| California Xtreme Fighting 3
| 
| align=center| 1
| align=center| 0:48
| Upland, California, United States
|

References

External links

Living people
1981 births
Welterweight kickboxers
Malaipet Sasiprapa
Muay Thai trainers
Lightweight mixed martial artists
Mixed martial artists utilizing Muay Thai
Malaipet Sasiprapa
Malaipet Sasiprapa
Thai expatriates in the United States
Sportspeople from Fresno, California